Drew Doughty (born December 8, 1989) is a Canadian professional ice hockey defenceman and alternate captain for the Los Angeles Kings of the National Hockey League (NHL). He was selected second overall by the Kings in the 2008 NHL Entry Draft from the Guelph Storm of the OHL, where he was twice voted the league's top offensive defenceman.

Doughty made his NHL debut in 2008 as an 18-year-old and was named to the All-Rookie Team. He is a two-time Stanley Cup champion with the Kings in the 2011–12 NHL season and the 2013–14 NHL season, two-time Olympic gold medallist with the Canadian national team at Vancouver 2010 and Sochi 2014, 2009 World Championship silver medallist, 2008 World Junior Championship gold medalist, and a Norris Trophy finalist from the 2009–10, 2014–15, 2015–16 and 2017–18 seasons, winning the trophy in 2015–16.

Early life
Doughty was born in London, Ontario, the son of Paul and Connie Doughty. He was introduced to hockey when he was given a mini stick for his first birthday, was skating by the age of two and was playing before he was four.  Doughty also played soccer in his youth as a goalkeeper – his father had a history with the game and his sister Chelsea is named after the English team of the same name. He was considered for a provincial under-14 team, but gave up the sport at 16 to focus on hockey.  Nonetheless, Doughty felt that his time playing goal in soccer helped him develop an awareness of the players and the game in hockey.

Playing career

Major junior
Doughty was selected by the Guelph Storm fifth overall in the 2005 Ontario Hockey League (OHL) Priority Selection draft. He scored five goals and 33 points for the Storm in 2005–06 and was named to the OHL All-Rookie Team on defence. Doughty played in the 2007 OHL All-Star Game and was voted the top offensive defenceman in the league by the coaches following a 74-point season in 2006–07.  He again won both honours in 2007–08 with a 50-point season, and was awarded the Max Kaminsky Trophy as the OHL's outstanding defenceman.  National Hockey League (NHL) Central Scouting ranked Doughty as the third best North American prospect for the 2008 NHL Entry Draft. He was selected second overall by the Los Angeles Kings, a choice that excited Doughty as he grew up a Kings fan and wanted to play in Los Angeles.

Los Angeles Kings (2008–present)

Early success in Los Angeles (2008–2011)
Doughty made the Kings opening day roster to start the 2008–09 NHL season, one of eight 18-year-olds to do so across the league. Earning a spot on the Kings roster overwhelmed Doughty, who did not expect to play in the NHL so quickly.  He made his NHL debut on October 11, 2008, against the San Jose Sharks, and scored his first goal on October 20 against the Colorado Avalanche.  The Kings had the option of returning him to junior without using up one year of his rookie contract if they did so before he played his tenth NHL game. However, they chose to keep him on the roster for the season.  His defensive partner, Sean O'Donnell agreed with the decision, praising Doughty's maturity.  He played 81 games in his rookie season, finishing with six goals and 21 assists, earning a spot on the NHL All-Rookie Team, while also playing in the Youngstars Game as part of the 2009 All-Star festivities.

Doughty improved to 59 points in his sophomore season of 2009–10 and finished third in the league in scoring amongst defencemen. 
He was named to the second all-star team and was named a finalist for the Norris Trophy as the league's top defenceman. His coach, Terry Murray, praised Doughty for his improvement during the season. Doughty helped lead the Kings into the playoffs for the first time since 2002, though they lost their first round series to the Vancouver Canucks. He played all six games of the series despite suffering a wrist injury in the first game that forced him to decline an invitation to play for Canada at the 2010 Men's World Ice Hockey Championships.

The Kings' media voted Doughty the team's outstanding defenceman for the third consecutive season in 2010–11. His offensive output fell from 59 points the previous season to 40, but he scored his 100th career point on December 21, 2010, against the Colorado Avalanche.  A restricted free agent following the season, Doughty and the Kings struggled to agree on a new contract.  The Kings offered $6.8 million per season over seven years, but Doughty rejected the offer. Though the Kings publicly stated they were not willing to sign him for a higher annual salary than team leader Anže Kopitar's $6.8 million, the two sides ultimately agreed on an eight-year, $56 million contract that made Doughty the highest paid player on the team at an average of $7 million per season. Doughty missed the majority of Los Angeles' training camp as a holdout, including five pre-season games, before signing the contract on September 29, 2011.

Stanley Cup titles (2012–2014)
In addition to missing training camp, Doughty suffered a concussion early in the season that forced him onto injured reserve.  He struggled upon his return from the injury and faced criticism that he had allowed his physical conditioning to lapse. Doughty himself admitted that he was not enjoying the game early in the season.  He said that his season turned a corner when the team replaced Murray with Darryl Sutter, a coach who preached the need for preparation.  Doughty was elevated into a role where he was expected to shut down the opposition's top forwards, forcing him to focus more on his defensive play than his offensive.  Consequently, Doughty's 36 points on the season was his lowest total in three years.  He was the top-scoring defenceman in the 2012 Stanley Cup playoffs, however, recording 16 points in 20 games to help the Kings win the first Stanley Cup championship in franchise history. Doughty was praised as the top player for either team in the final series, a six-game victory over the New Jersey Devils.

Doughty won his second Stanley Cup in 2014 against the New York Rangers, becoming the seventh player to win both an Olympic hockey gold medal and the Stanley Cup in the same year.

Norris Trophy win and continued success (2015–present)
During the 2015–16 season, Doughty had a career-high plus 24 rating, while also leading the league in shot attempts and ranking third in average ice time for the Kings. At the end of the year, Doughty won the 2015–16 Norris Trophy as the NHL's top defenceman. It was his third nomination; he finished second in voting in 2014–15 and third in 2009–10.

During the 2016–17 season Doughty was selected to participate in the 2017 NHL All-Star Game (along with teammate Jeff Carter) after leading the team's defense in goals and coming in second in points. The following season, Doughty was again selected to participate in the All-Star Game, marking his fourth consecutive selection. Doughty was also named a finalist for the Norris Trophy again. During the 2018 Stanley Cup playoffs Doughty was suspended for one game for an illegal hit to the head during Game 1 against the Vegas Golden Knights.

On July 1, 2018, Doughty agreed to an 8-year, $88 million contract extension with the Kings, which will see him signed through until the 2026–27 season.

On October 8, 2019, Doughty scored the winning goal in a game against the Calgary Flames, but it was his post-goal celebration that received media attention. Doughty allegedly yelled "Suck my dick!" at Flames' fans at ice level, while performing a "crotch chop" motion made famous in professional wrestling circles.

After starting the 2021–22 season with 7 points leading all NHL defensemen in scoring, on October 22, 2021, Doughty collided knee-to-knee with Dallas Stars defenseman Jani Hakanpää, suffering a tibial plateau contusion. He missed 16 games as a result, returning to game action on November 30, 2021. On January 27, 2022, Drew Doughty played his 1,000th NHL game, in a match against the New York Islanders. He would be injured again on March 7, 2022, requiring season ending wrist surgery. In 39 games played, Doughty recorded 7 goals and 31 points.

International play

In 2006, Doughty played with Team Ontario at the World U-17 Hockey Challenge, finishing fifth, then won a gold medal with the national under-18 team at the Ivan Hlinka Memorial Tournament.  He participated the 2007 IIHF World U18 Championships, scoring five points in six games for the fourth place Canadians, and while he was considered for the Canadian junior team for the 2007 World Junior Ice Hockey Championships, he did not make the cut.  Doughty was named to participate in the 2007 Super Series, an eight-game tournament against the Russian juniors meant to commemorate the 35th anniversary of the 1972 Summit Series.  He played in all eight games, recording two assists, as Canada finished the series unbeaten with seven wins and a tie. He then earned a spot on the roster for the 2008 World Junior Ice Hockey Championships. Doughty was named a tournament all-star, and given the Directorate Award for Best Defenceman after helping lead the Canadians to their fourth consecutive gold medal at the tournament.

Following his rookie season in the NHL, Doughty made his debut with the senior team, playing in the 2009 Men's World Ice Hockey Championships.  He scored one goal and added six assists in nine games, however the Canadians settled for silver after losing the championship game to Russia, 2–1.  His strong play in the World Championships earned Doughty an invitation to Canada's summer orientation camp for the 2010 Winter Olympics. Doughty earned one of the final spots on the Canadian defence, beating out established players such as Dion Phaneuf, Jay Bouwmeester and Mike Green. Doughty became the youngest player to represent Canada in a major best-on-best tournament since Eric Lindros participated in the 1991 Canada Cup at the age of 18. He emerged as one of the top defenders on the team, and won the gold medal as Canada defeated the United States in the final game. He was on the ice when Sidney Crosby scored the tournament-winning goal in overtime. Doughty was a star at the 2014 Winter Olympics, where Canada defended its gold medal title. He led the team with four goals and featured prominently on a defensive core which allowed only three goals in six games en route to being undefeated, one of the best team performances in Olympic history.

Personal life
Doughty's maternal grandparents immigrated to Canada from Portugal in the 1950s and his paternal grandparents immigrated to Canada from England in the 1970s.

Doughty married his highschool sweetheart Nicole Arruda on August 8, 2018 in Muskoka, Ontario.

Career statistics

Regular season and playoffs
Bold indicates led league

International

Awards and honours

 The Hockey News, Bobby Orr Award (Best Defenseman) - 2018
 NHL All-Decade First Team 2010-2019

References
Career statistics:

External links

1989 births
Canadian ice hockey defencemen
Guelph Storm players
Los Angeles Kings draft picks
National Hockey League first-round draft picks
Los Angeles Kings players
Ice hockey players at the 2010 Winter Olympics
Ice hockey players at the 2014 Winter Olympics
Olympic ice hockey players of Canada
Medalists at the 2010 Winter Olympics
Medalists at the 2014 Winter Olympics
Olympic medalists in ice hockey
Olympic gold medalists for Canada
National Hockey League All-Stars
Stanley Cup champions
Ice hockey people from Ontario
Sportspeople from London, Ontario
Canadian people of Portuguese descent
Living people
James Norris Memorial Trophy winners